Mikhail Aleksandrovich Vasiliev (born June 8, 1962 in Elektrougli, Soviet Union) is a retired ice hockey player who played in the Soviet Hockey League. He played for Torpedo Yaroslavl and HC CSKA Moscow in the Soviet Union, and for HC Selva, EV Bozen 84, AS Mastini Varese Hockey and HC Bolzano in Italy. He played for a season (1997–98) in Denmark for Rødovre IK, too. He was inducted into the Russian and Soviet Hockey Hall of Fame in 1983.

Career statistics

Regular season and playoffs

International

External links 

 Russian and Soviet Hockey Hall of Fame bio

1962 births
Living people
Bolzano HC players
ECH Chur players
HC CSKA Moscow players
HC Varese players
Lokomotiv Yaroslavl players
Medalists at the 1984 Winter Olympics
Olympic medalists in ice hockey
People from Noginsky District
Rødovre Mighty Bulls players
Soviet ice hockey left wingers
Olympic ice hockey players of the Soviet Union
Ice hockey players at the 1984 Winter Olympics
Russian ice hockey left wingers
Sportspeople from Moscow Oblast
Russian expatriate sportspeople in Denmark
Expatriate ice hockey players in Denmark
Russian expatriate sportspeople in Italy
Expatriate ice hockey players in Italy
Russian expatriate ice hockey people